Føringatíðindi (The Faroes Journal) was a Faroese newspaper. It was published from January 1890 to December 1901, and then again from January to December 1906. The newspaper was the organ of the Faroese Society and it was the first newspaper written in Faroese. It was characterized by lexical purism.

The paper's long-serving editor, Rasmus Effersøe, was one of the leading men of his generation in the Faroese independence movement, and he was one of the nine men that convened the Christmas Meeting of 1888. Andrias Christian Evensen, who also served as editor during the short publication span in 1906, was one of the first to propagate the use of Faroese in education and church.

Editors
Rasmus Effersøe, 1890–1901
Andrias Christian Evensen, 1906

See also
Símun Mikkjal Zachariasen

References

External links
Digitized copies of Føringatíðindi at Tímarit.is

Newspapers published in the Faroe Islands
Publications established in 1890
1890s establishments in the Faroe Islands
Publications disestablished in 1906